Rahn Mayo is a former Democratic member of the Georgia House of Representatives, serving from 2009 until January 2017. In addition to his service in the legislature, Mayo has also worked as a real estate broker, radio co-host, and sales executive.

Mayo's father, Whitman Mayo, was an actor on Sanford and Son (playing the role of Fred's best friend Grady Wilson) and other programs.

References

External links

Legislative page
Twitter account

Living people
Democratic Party members of the Georgia House of Representatives
People from Decatur, Georgia
21st-century American politicians
African-American state legislators in Georgia (U.S. state)
Year of birth missing (living people)
21st-century African-American politicians